Kellett Bay, or Kai Lung Wan is a bay on southwestern Hong Kong Island in Hong Kong, to the southeast of Waterfall Bay.

Kellett Bay was named after the naval officer Sir Henry Kellett. Kellett Island and Mount Kellett were also named after him.

History
In 1960s, the cemetery was replaced by Wah Fu Estate at Waterfall Bay. Most of the areas are reclaimed to build Wah Kwai Estate.

References

 
Bays of Hong Kong
Pok Fu Lam
Southern District, Hong Kong